Estado Libre Asociado de Puerto Rico  is the official name in Spanish of the Commonwealth of Puerto Rico. Its literal translation is "Associated Free State of Puerto Rico". The official name was suggested by its architect Luis Muñoz Marín and adopted by a constitutional assembly on 25 July 1952. Puerto Rico is an unincorporated territory of the United States.

Some authorities have stated that the official name Estado Libre Asociado constitutes a euphemism, that is, a term intended to give positive appearances to negative events or even mislead entirely, and have charged that the official name in English of "Commonwealth" constitutes a fig leaf, i.e., a term used figuratively and associated with the covering up of an act that is actually embarrassing or distasteful with something of innocuous appearance. Puerto Rico remains a territory of the United States, exercising substantial internal self-government, but subordinated to the U.S. Constitution in areas such as foreign affairs or defense. For this reason, it is not considered to be a full-fledged associated state under either international or U.S. domestic law.

References

Politics of Puerto Rico
Political organizations based in Puerto Rico
Political history of Puerto Rico